Scrobipalpa salinella, the sea-aster groundling, is a moth of the family Gelechiidae. It is found Europe, along the coast and in inland halophytic habitats. In the east, the range extends through Siberia and Central Asia to Mongolia. It is also found in North Africa.

Adults have been recorded on wing from June to September.

The larvae feed on Salicornia fruticosa (syn. Arthrocnemum fruticosum), Arthrocaulon macrostachyum (syn. Arthrocnemum macrostachyum) and Salicornia europaea. They mine the leaves of their host plant. The mine has the form of a long, narrow lower- or upper-surface corridor, with a black or brown central frass line. After some time, the larva leaves the mine and starts a shorter and broader full depth blotch mine. Older larvae live freely amongst spun leaves. The larvae can be found from April to June. They are dirty yellow with a light brown head.

Subspecies
Scrobipalpa salinella salinella
Scrobipalpa salinella salicorniae (E. Hering, 1889) (coasts of northern Europe, Central Europe, southern Urals)

Scrobipalpa salicorniae is sometimes considered a distinct species. Other authors treat salicorniae as a northern subspecies, living on Salicornia, while the southern (typical) subspecies feeds on former Arthrocnemum species.

References

Moths described in 1847
Scrobipalpa
Moths of Europe